Samantha (or the alternatively Samanta) is primarily used as a feminine given name. It was recorded in England in 1633 in Newton Regis, Warwickshire. It was also recorded in the 18th century in New England, but its etymology is uncertain.
Speculation (without evidence) has suggested an origin from the masculine given name Samuel and anthos, the Greek word for "flower". One theory is that it was a feminine form of Samuel to which the already existing feminine name Anthea was added.

"Samantha" remained a rare name until the 1873 publication of the first novel in a series by Marietta Holley, featuring the adventures of a lady named "Samantha", wife of Josiah Allen. The series led to the rise in the name's popularity, ranking among the top 1,000 names for girls in the United States from 1880, the earliest year for which records are available, to 1902.

The name was out of fashion in the United States for the majority of the first half of the 20th century but reappeared among the top 1,000 names for girls in 1958, when it ranked in 998th position, and in 1959, when it ranked in 993rd place. It fell off the top 1,000 list again until 1964, when it reappeared in 472nd place and leapt another 293 places to 179th place in 1965, coinciding with the 1964 debut of the television show, Bewitched, featuring as a lead character a young witch named "Samantha Stephens".

The name has remained consistently popular in the United States since the 1960s. It has ranked among the top 200 names for girls since 1965 and among the top 100 names for girls since 1976. It was among the ten most popular names for American girls born between 1988 and 2006 and was among the top 100 names for American girls until 2020. It was the 105th most popular name for American girls born in 2021. It has also been well-used in other countries in English-speaking countries and in Mexico.

In Sri Lanka, Samantha is used as a masculine given name, being one of the forms of the name of the god Saman. This usage has no known connection with the feminine version.

Transliterations

 Arabic: سمانثا (Samantha)
 Albanian: Samanthë, Samantë
 Armenian: Սամանթա (Samant'a), Սամանտա (Samanta)
 Belarusian: Саманта (Samanta)
 Bulgarian: Саманта (Samanta)
 Chinese Simplified: 萨曼莎 (Sàmànshā)
 Chinese Traditional: 薩曼莎 (Sàmànshā)
 Dutch: Samantha
 Esperanto: Samanta
 French: Samantha
 German: Samantha
 Greek: Σαμάνθα
 Gujarati: સમન્તા (Samantā)
 Hebrew: סמנתה
 Hindi: सामन्था (Sāmanthā)
 Hungarian: Szamanta
 Italian: Samanta
 Japanese: サマンサ (Samansa)
 Kannada: ಸಮಂತಾ (Samantā)
 Khmer: សុមន្ថា (Somontha)
 Korean: 사만다 (Samanda)
 Latvian: Samanta
 Mongolian: Саманта (Samanta)
 Marathi: सामान्था (Sāmānthā) 
 Persian: سامانتا (Samanta)
 Portuguese: Samanta
 Swahili: Samandha
 Russian: Саманта (Samanta)
 Serbian: Саманта (Samanta)
 Spanish: Samanta
 Tamil: சமாந்தா (Samantha)
 Telugu: సమంతా (Samantā)
 Thai: ซาแมนต้า (Sāmænt̂ā)
 Ukrainian: Саманта (Samanta)
 Urdu: سامنتھا (Samantha)
 Yiddish: סאַמאַנטהאַ (Sʼamʼanthʼa)\
English: Samantha (Samantha)

Notable people

Female

 Samantha Albert (born 1971), Canadian-born equestrienne who represents Jamaica in international competition
 Samantha Armytage (born 1976), Australian journalist and television news reporter
 Samantha Arsenault (born 1981), American swimmer and Olympic champion
 Samantha Barks (born 1990), Manx singer and actress
 Samantha Barning (born 1989), Dutch professional badminton player
 Samantha Beckinsale (born 1966), English actress
 Samantha Bee (born 1969), Canadian actress and comedian
 Samantha Bond (born 1961), English actress
 Samantha Boscarino (born 1994), American actress
 Sam Brown (born 1964), English singer
 Samantha Brown (born 1970), American television host
 Samantha Browne-Walters (born 1991), American actress
 Samantha Buck (born 1976), American actress
 Aunt Samantha Bumgarner (1878-1960), acclaimed country and folk music performer of the early 1900s
 Samantha Cameron (née Sheffield, born 1971), English business executive and wife of politician David Cameron
 Lan Samantha Chang (born 1965), American writer of novels and short stories
 Samantha Cole (born 1978), American dance-pop singer/songwriter
 Samantha Cools (born 1986), Canadian Bicycle Motocross (BMX) racer
 Samantha Cornish (born 1980), professional surfer from New South Wales, Australia
 Samantha Cristoforetti (born 1977), Italian astronaut
 Samantha Davies (born 1974), British yachtswoman
 Samantha Davies (born 1979), British sprint athlete
 Samantha Dorman (born 1968), American model and actress
 Samantha Dorrance (born 1992), British actor and dancer
 Samantha Downie (born 1987), Australian model
 Samantha Dubois (1955–1992), Dutch radio presenter
 Samantha Eggar (born 1939), English actress
 Samantha "Sam" Faber (born 1987), American ice hockey player
 Samantha Farquharson (born 1969), English athlete
 Samantha Ferris (born 1968), Canadian actress and television reporter
 Samantha Fox (born 1966), English former glamour model and dance-pop singer
 Samantha Giancola (born 1987), American television personality and actress
 Samantha Giles (born 1971), British actress
 Samantha Gillison, American author
 Sammy Glenn (born 1983), English actress
 Samantha Harris (born 1973), American television presenter
 Sam Healy (born 1976), Australian actress
 Samantha Heath (born 1960), British politician
 Samantha Holland (born 1969), English actress
 Samantha Holvey, American beauty queen
 Samantha Inoue-Harte (born 1979), American anime voice actress
 Samantha Irby, African-American blogger, comedian, and author
 Samantha Jade (born 1987), singer-songwriter also known as Samantha Gibbs
 Samantha James (born 1979), American dance musician
 Samantha Johnson (born 1991), American professional soccer defender
 Samantha Johnson (born 1984), American beauty pageant
 Samantha Jones (born 1943), née Jean Owen, English singer and entertainer
 Samantha Josephson (died 2019), American murder victim
 Samantha Judge (born 1978), field hockey forward from Scotland
 Samantha Juste (1944–2014), née Sandra Slater, the "disc girl" on the 1960s BBC television show Top of the Pops
 Samantha Kerr (born 1993), Australian association football player
 Samantha Kinghorn (born 1996), Scottish wheelchair racer
 Samantha Lam (born 1978), Chinese-Canadian equestrian
 Samantha Lane (born 1979), Australian television personality and sports reporter
 Samantha Larson (born 1988), American mountain climber
 Samantha Leigh Martin (born 1985), former child actress from England
 Samantha Leriche-Gionet (born 1985), Canadian animator, illustrator, and comic strip author
 Samantha Lewes (1952–2002), American actress also known as Susan Jane Dillingham and Samantha Dillingham
 Samantha Maloney (born 1975), American musician
 Samantha Mathis (born 1970), American actress
 Samantha Morton (born 1977), English actress
 Samantha Mumba (born 1983), Irish singer and actress
 Samantha Munro (born 1990), Canadian actress
 Samantha Murray (born 1989), English modern pentathlete
 Samantha Murray (born 1987), British tennis player
 Samantha Navarro (born 1971), Uruguayan singer and composer
 Samantha Page, a newscaster on Naked News
 Samantha Peszek (born 1991), American gymnast
 Samantha Power (born 1970), American diplomat and academic
 Samantha Reeves (born 1979), American tennis player
 Samantha Ruth Prabhu (born 1987), Indian actress
 Samantha De Reviziis (born 1985), Italian web influencer 
 Samantha Runnion (1996–2002), American female murder victim
 Samantha Sang (born 1951), Australian pop singer
 Samantha Shapiro (born 1993), American gymnast
 Samantha Smith (1972–1985), child peace activist and actress who died in a plane crash at age 13
 Samantha Smith (born 1971), British tennis player
 Samantha Stosur (born 1984), Australian tennis player
 Sam Taylor-Johnson (born 1967), English Filmmaker
 Sam Virgo (born 1987), Australian rules footballer
 Samanie Warren-Close (born 1990), British guitarist, singer, photographer, craft beer exporter and reality television personality.
 Samantha Weinstein (born 1995), Canadian actress
 Samantha Womack (born 1972 as Samantha Janus), English actress and singer

Male

 Samantha de Mel (born 1965), Sri Lankan-born Italian cricketer
 Samantha Dodanwela (born 1970), Sri Lankan cricketer and tea company CEO
 Samantha Fernando (born 1985), Sri Lankan cricketer
 Samantha Sooriyabandara (died 2012), Sri Lankan army officer
 K. V. Samantha Vidyaratna, Sri Lankan politician
 Samantha Vithanage (born c. 1980), student murdered in Sri Lankan university

Fictional characters

 Sheriff Samantha Parker, a character in the 2002 monster comedy action film Eight Legged Freaks
 Samantha, a character in the 2009 American fantasy comedy movie 17 Again
 Samantha, a sentient AI from the movie Her
 Samantha, the silent scorer in the BBC radio comedy panel game I'm Sorry I Haven't a Clue
 Samantha, the protagonist from Need for Speed: Underground
 Samantha, a character the panicked Olaf searches for in Disney's Frozen II (before he realizes he doesn't know a Samantha)
 Samantha Albertson, a character in the movie Now and Then, played by both Gaby Hoffmann and Demi Moore
 Samantha Anderson, on the American TV soap opera As the World Turns
 Samantha Baker, in the film Sixteen Candles
 Samantha "Sam" Barnes, in the audio drama The Bright Sessions
 Sami Brady, on the American soap opera Days of Our Lives
 Sammy Jo Carrington, character in the American TV series Dynasty
 Samantha Carter, a witty female scientist and soldier from the television show Stargate SG-1 and related spinoffs, one of the six original main characters.
 Samantha Cole, a character in the film Liar Liar
 Samantha Darko, in the film Donnie Darko and its sequel, S. Darko
 Samantha Fitzgerald, recurring character on the Australian soap opera Neighbours
 Samantha "Sam" Giddings, one of eight protagonists from the survival horror game Until Dawn
 Samantha Groves, in the television show Person of Interest, played by Amy Acker
 Sam Jones, in the Eighth Doctor Adventures novels
 Samantha, James' seductive new boss in the 1993 film Look Who's Talking Now
 Samantha Jones, in the television show Sex and the City, played by Kim Cattrall
 Samantha "Sam" Kanisky, a character on the American television sitcom Gimme a Break
 Samantha Kingston, in the film Before I Fall, played by Zoey Deutch
 Samantha Tracy Lord, in the film High Society, played by Grace Kelly
 Samantha "Sam" Manson, from Danny Phantom
 Sam McCall, on the American soap opera General Hospital Samantha "Sam" Micelli, a character in the TV show Who's the Boss? Samantha "Sam" Milano, a character in the TV sitcom Step by Step Sam Mitchell, in the BBC One soap opera EastEnders Samantha "Sam" Montgomery, in the film A Cinderella Story Samantha "Sam" Moore, a character in the 1989 action movie No Holds Barred Samantha Mulder, Fox Mulder's sister on the TV show The X-Files. Samantha was abducted by aliens before the show's start.
 Samantha Parkington, a character in the American Girl series
 Sam Puckett, from iCarly, played by Jennette McCurdy
 Samantha Spade, in the TV series Without a Trace, played by Poppy Montgomery
 Samantha Stephens, in the TV show Bewitched Samantha Taggart, in the TV show ER Samantha Sammy, a fictional seal from Putt-Putt Saves the Zoo Samantha Evelyn Cook/Art3mis, Wade Watts' girlfriend in Ready Player One (2011), Ready Player One (2018 movie) and eventual wife in the end of Ready Player Two (2020) Samantha Simpson, one of the main protagonists from animated TV show Totally Spies''

References

English feminine given names
Sinhalese masculine given names